Nina Avgustinovna Adolf (1903–1951) was a Russian botanist.

References

1903 births
1951 deaths
20th-century Russian botanists
Russian women botanists
Soviet botanists